Walter Secord (born 25 December 1964) is a Canadian-born Australian politician. He has been a Labor Party member of the New South Wales Legislative Council since May 2011, when he was elected to fill the vacancy left by the retirement of Eddie Obeid. Secord was previously chief of staff to former NSW Premier, Kristina Keneally.

Early life and education 
Secord was born in Hamilton, Ontario and grew up on the Mississaugas of the Credit (Indian reserve) First Nation in Southern Ontario, Canada, and is a Mohawk-Ojibwe man whose father is a status Indian. He spent the first 17 years of his life on an Indian reserve. He states he is "fiercely proud of [his] aboriginal ancestry" and "that it shapes [his] social justice."

He has two siblings. His brother, Dan, is a budding native rights leader in Canada and conducts annual Ojibway language camp ceremonies for native prisoners in Canada's toughest prisons. He was the first member of his father’s family to complete high school and the first to fly in aeroplane.

Early career and higher education
He studied arts at York University in Toronto, and worked as a journalist for the Toronto Star before emigrating to Australia in September 1988. He became an Australian citizen in June 1992.

From 1988 to 1991, he worked at the Australian Jewish News. Ïn November 1991, he won an Australian Human Rights Award in 1991 for a series of articles in the Australian Jewish News.

Secord attained a Master’s Degree in Strategic Public Relations from Sydney University in 2013.

Political career
Walt Secord was Bob Carr’s communications director and went on to become Kevin Rudd's director of communications. Secord was appointed as Shadow Treasurer, Shadow Minister for the Arts and Shadow Special Minister of State in the shadow cabinet of Jodi McKay in July 2019. Following Labor's defeat at the Upper Hunter by-election in May 2021, there was speculation that McKay would resign as party leader. After McKay announced she was not stepping down as party leader, Secord resigned from the shadow cabinet on 25 May 2021. He said it was "well-known that Jodi McKay and [he] have disagreed on key policy, parliamentary and strategic decisions and directions", and that he could no longer serve under her.

Secord served as  Shadow Minister for the Arts and Heritage, Shadow Minister for Police, Shadow Minister for Counter Terrorism and Shadow Minister for the North Coast in the NSW Shadow Cabinet until his resignation in August 2022.

In his almost 12 years in NSW Parliament, Secord served in more than a dozen Shadow Ministerial roles including four years as Deputy Opposition Leader in the Legislative Council and almost two years as Shadow Treasurer.

Secord also served as Shadow Minister for Health, Shadow Minister for Roads, Shadow Minister for Police, Shadow Minister for Counter Terrorism, Shadow Special Minister of State, Shadow Minister for Mental Health, Shadow Minister for Medical Research, Shadow Minister for Water, Shadow Minister for the Arts and Heritage; Shadow Minister for Liquor Regulation and Shadow Minister for the North Coast. 

In 2022, Secord chaired the official parliamentary inquiry into the historic 2022 floods.

In addition, he served as deputy chair of the NSW Parliamentary Friends of Israel; deputy chair of the NSW Parliamentary Friends of Armenia; and secretary of the NSW Parliamentary Friends of an Australian Head of State.

He is also the NSW patron of the Labor Israel Action Committee.

Before entering parliament, Secord served in senior roles at the local, NSW and Federal levels including chief of staff to the NSW Premier (2009-2011); chief of staff to the NSW Treasurer (2009); director of communications to the longest-serving NSW Premier (1995-2005); director of communications to the Federal Opposition leader, who became Prime Minister (2007); and chief of staff to the national Minister for (Aged Care) Ageing (2007-2009). 

In May 2012, Secord  won the Australian Press Council Prize (Postgraduate) in Media and Communications at the University of Sydney.

Personal life 
Secord married his partner on October 2021. Secord is the deputy chair of NSW Parliamentary Friends of Israel. In 2020 he announced that he was converting to Judaism. He has visited Israel multiple times and previously worked for the Australian Jewish News. He described his conversion as "the logical step of a lifelong journey that was inevitable".

Bullying allegations 

Published on 12 August 2022, the Independent Review of Bullying, Sexual Harassment and Sexual Misconduct in NSW Parliamentary Workplaces 2022 headed by Elizabeth Broderick outlined a range of inappropriate and criminal behaviour that had taken place in NSW Parliament workplaces. The allegations in the report were made anonymously, as were the identities of the alleged offenders, but a submission obtained by the ABC identified Secord as the MP in the report described as "a vicious manipulative bully who particularly targeted junior staff and young women". The submission further elaborated that "at various times he used his position, size and voice to pressure, berate, intimidate and humiliate staff to get his own way, with no issue too petty to bring about one of his outbursts.” Secord apologised for his behaviour and resigned from the Shadow Ministry on 15 August 2022 in response to the bullying allegations. On 19 August 2022, Secord announced his retirement from politics at the end of his current term in NSW Parliament.

In the Australian Jewish News, Secord described the allegations against him as a “political assassination” and an “orchestrated plan.”

Secord later addressed the allegations against him in his final speech to the NSW Parliament on 16 November 2022, claiming the allegations against him were the result of a conspiracy between “disgruntled supporters of the former Labor leader and a pocket of vicious anti-Israel actors”: It would be remiss of me if I did not address the elephant in the room. I admit I was a tough operator in the New South Wales Labor Party and in the Parliament, but I assure you there are tougher ones. I was brought down when two forces conspired around a goal—getting me out of Parliament. Those cliques comprise mainly disgruntled supporters of the former Labor leader and a pocket of vicious anti-Israel actors. 

Addressing the first group, I do not at all regret starting the May 2021 process as shadow Treasurer that eventually saw the removal of the former Opposition leader. To the contrary, I am proud of my role in those events and in shaping Labor history. NSW Labor is in a much stronger position today than we were then. Anyone who denies that really needs to get out and talk to the community more often. As to the latter group, again I regret nothing. I believe it is imperative that there is always a strong Labor voice in support of the Jewish community and the State of Israel. This is akin to one person standing up to a mob and on that issue I proudly stand on my record.

References

1964 births
Living people
Australian Jews
Australian people of First Nations descent
Members of the New South Wales Legislative Council
First Nations politicians
Canadian newspaper journalists
Canadian male journalists
Toronto Star people
Canadian Mohawk people
Ojibwe people
York University alumni
Canadian emigrants to Australia
Naturalised citizens of Australia
Australian Labor Party members of the Parliament of New South Wales
21st-century Australian politicians
Mississauga people